The Bingham Ray Breakthrough Director Award is one of the annual Gotham Independent Film Awards and honors feature film directorial debuts. Named after Bingham Ray since 2013, the breakthrough director award was first given in 1991 as the Open Palm Award, with Jennie Livingston being the first recipient of the award, for her work in Paris Is Burning. From 1991 to 1996 only the winner was announced, since 1997, a set of 5 to 6 nominees is presented annually.

Winners and nominees

1990s

2000s

2010s

2020s

See also
John Cassavetes Award
Independent Spirit Award for Best First Feature

References

1991 establishments in New York City
Awards established in 1991
Film directing awards
Breakthrough Director